, also known as , was a Japanese botanist and herbalist, known as the "Japanese Linnaeus".

He was born in Kyoto to a courtly family, and studied in his youth under Matsuoka Shoan. In 1754, he opened a school of botanical pharmacology (pharmacognosy) which enjoyed considerable success, with over a thousand pupils enrolling. 

One student who studied under Ono at this time was Kimura Kenkadō. In 1799, he was given a post at the Seijūkan, the country's major government medical school in Edo. Here he worked extensively  on a translation into Japanese of Rembert Dodoens' herbal guide, the Cruydeboeck. Ono was familiar with Western herbalism  (making use of the work of Johann Wilhelm Weinmann in his translation) and had studied both traditional Chinese medicine and Western medicine as well. Some of Ono's own works on Japanese botany were translated by the French botanist Ludovic Savatier.

It was a piece on natural history espousing viewpoints independent from China's Honzō Kōmoku (the Bencao Gangmu). Despite Ono's knowledge of Western and Chinese botany, this was one of the first books in the Japanese natural sciences to advocate experimentation and research rather than reliance on the Chinese Classics. Ono never married, but fathered a son with one of his household servants. 

After his death in 1810 he was interred at Asakusa; however, his remains were moved to Nerima in 1927 after the graveyard was damaged in the Great Kantō earthquake. The barberry species Ranzania japonica was named in his honour.

Editions

References

1729 births
1810 deaths
19th-century Japanese botanists
Japanese pharmacists
People from Kyoto
18th-century Japanese botanists